Ahokas is a Finnish surname. Notable people with the surname include:

Antti Ahokas (born 1985), Finnish golfer
Juha Ahokas (born 1969), Finnish Greco-Roman wrestler
Pertti Ahokas (born 1947), Finnish ice hockey player

Finnish-language surnames